Arkhara is an Urban-type settlement and the administrative center of the Arkharinsky District in Amur Oblast, Russia. It is located at the junction of the Transbaikal Railway and the Far Eastern Railway. The Arkhara River flows near the town. Population:

References

Notes

Sources

Urban-type settlements in Amur Oblast
Arkharinsky District
Amur Oblast (Russian Empire)